Ath.Lon is the sixth studio album by Greek synthpop duo Marsheaux. After covering Depeche Mode's album A Broken Frame in 2015, Marsheaux released new original tracks on this album. The name Ath.Lon is a combination of Athens and London where the album was produced.

Reception

The reviewer for Release Magazine lauded the production and found that the album contained influences of Chvrches and Ladytron. According to The Arts Desk, Ath.Lon was remiscent of Philip Glass and New Order but suffered from a "weedy" production. The Electricity Club noted "excellently layered sounds" with  motorik beats similar to early Depeche Mode releases.

Track listing

Standard edition

References

External links
 Official site
 Undo Records site

2016 albums
Marsheaux albums